Enkhbatyn Amartuvshin, (born 23 March 1986), is a Mongolian operatic baritone and People's Artist of Mongolia. Also known as Amartuvshin Enkhbat, he has been a soloist in the State Academic Opera and Ballet Theatre of Mongolia since 2008.

Education
Amartüvshin was born on 23 March 1986 in Sukhbaatar in Mongolia. In 2009 he graduated from State University of Arts and Culture, Ulaanbaatar, Mongolia (class of Professor Mrs. Tserenpil Eruu).

Competitions and awards
Amartüvshin won numerous national and international opera competitions, including the Mongolian National Competition for Young Opera Singers (2009, II Prize), international opera competition BAIKAL in Ulan-Ude, Russia (2011, I prize), XIV Tchaikovsky Competition in St. Petersburg, Russia (2011, II prize and a public award for the best male singer), Operalia Competition, Beijing, China (2012, I prize). He also won the Dame Joan Sutherland Audience Prize at the 2015 BBC Cardiff Singer of the World competition.

Repertoire
His stage roles have included Escamillo in Carmen by Bizet, Tonio in I Pagliacci by Leoncavallo, Aleko in Aleko by Rachmaninov, Genghis Khan in Genghis Khan by Sharav, Onegin in Eugene Onegin by Tchaikovsky, Prince Yeletsky in The Queen of Spades by Tchaikovsky, Amonasro in Aida by Verdi, Count di Luna in Il Trovatore by Verdi, Giorgio Germont in La Traviata by Verdi the title role in Nabucco and in Rigoletto, both by Verdi.

References

External links
 Official website
  Amartüvshin's page on the site of SMOLART International Artist Management Agency.
 Amartüvshin in the list of Operalia 2012 winners

1986 births
Living people
Operatic baritones
21st-century Mongolian male singers
Operalia, The World Opera Competition prize-winners
21st-century male opera singers
People from Selenge Province
Prize-winners of the International Tchaikovsky Competition